Konrad Wasiela (born June 14, 1985) is a former professional Canadian football cornerback. He was signed by the BC Lions as an undrafted free agent in 2007. He played CIS football for the UBC Thunderbirds.

Wasiela also played for the Saskatchewan Roughriders and Montreal Alouettes.

External links
Saskatchewan Roughriders bio

1985 births
Living people
BC Lions players
Canadian football defensive backs
Players of Canadian football from British Columbia
Saskatchewan Roughriders players
Canadian football people from Vancouver
UBC Thunderbirds football players